Russell Alan Barkley (born December 27, 1949) is a clinical psychologist who is a clinical professor of psychiatry at the VCU Medical Center and an author of books on attention-deficit hyperactivity disorder (ADHD). Involved in research since 1973 and a licensed psychologist since 1977, he is an expert on ADHD and has devoted much of his scientific career to studying ADHD and related fields like childhood defiance. He proposed to change the name of sluggish cognitive tempo (SCT) to concentration deficit disorder (CDD).

Author of 27 books and more than 280 scientific papers and book chapters, his research articles include multiple papers from his longitudinal study in Milwaukee, Wisconsin, his development of a theory of ADHD as a disorder of executive functioning and self-regulation, his early research on family interaction patterns in ADHD children, his more recent studies on the nature of ADHD in adults, early intervention for children at risk for ADHD, training parents to manage ADHD and defiant behavior, and the nature of sluggish cognitive tempo. He is an "Impassioned editor" of the SCT wikipedia page. His research has been cited by more than 91,000 other authors and he has a H-index (citation impact factor) of 133 on Google Scholar. Barkley also edits The ADHD Report, a newsletter for clinicians and parents. Besides his clinical work, he is also an expert in the neuropsychology of executive function and self-regulation.  He has given more than 800 invited lectures in more than 30 countries during his career, and is board certified in three clinical specialties:  clinical neuropsychology, clinical psychology, and clinical child and adolescent psychology.

Early life and education

Russell Alan Barkley was born in Newburgh, New York. He was one of five children, born to US Air Force Colonel Donald Stuart Barkley (27 February 1916 – 15 June 1999) and Mildred Minerva née Terbush (10 September 1914 – 25 April 2008). Barkley had a fraternal twin brother, Ronald Foster Barkley, who was killed in a car crash on 24 July 2006. Barkley attributes his brother's history of dangerous and reckless behavior, including not wearing a seat belt and speeding at the time of his crash, to untreated ADHD. Ronald was several times over the legal alcohol limit, speeding and not wearing a seat belt at the time of his fatal crash.

Barkley earned an Associate of Arts from Wayne Community College in Goldsboro, North Carolina in June 1972, and a BA in psychology from the University of North Carolina at Chapel Hill. He earned an MA and Ph.D. in clinical psychology from Bowling Green State University in Bowling Green, Ohio. From July 1976 to 1977, Barkley was an intern at the University of Oregon Health Sciences Center in Portland, Oregon.

Career
In 1977, Barkley began his professional career at the Medical College of Wisconsin and Milwaukee Children's Hospital, where in 1978, he founded the Neuropsychology Service and served as its chief until 1985. He then moved to the University of Massachusetts Medical School, where he served as Director of Psychology from 1985 to 2000. Barkley was professor of psychiatry and neurology at the University of Massachusetts Medical Center. In 2005, he joined the State University of New York Upstate Medical University in Syracuse, New York, where he was a consultant and research professor of psychiatry. He taught at the Medical University of South Carolina from 2003 to 2016 and then moved to Virginia Commonwealth University Medical Center in Richmond, Virginia, where he taught in the Department of Psychiatry until 2020.

Besides his books, he has published six clinical rating scales related to ADHD, executive functioning, and impairment.  One of Barkley's rating scales for adult ADHD evaluates sluggish cognitive tempo. Sluggish Cognitive Tempo has its critics. Allen Frances called sluggish cognitive tempo a "Dumb and dangerous diagnostic idea" in April 2014. Frances said "We're seeing a fad in evolution: Just as ADHD has been the diagnosis du jour for 15 years or so, this is the beginning of another. This is a public health experiment on millions of kids...I have no doubt there are kids who meet the criteria for this thing, but nothing is more irrelevant. The enthusiasts here are thinking of missed patients. What about the mislabeled kids who are called patients when there’s nothing wrong with them? They are not considering what is happening in the real world."

Barkley believes between 5-7% of children have ADHD.

Views on medication

In 1978, Barkley wrote that "Stimulant drug studies based primarily on measures of teacher opinion have frequently concluded that these drugs improve the achievement of hyperkinetic children. However, a review of those studies using more objective measures of academic performance revealed few positive short-term or long-term drug effects on these measures. What few improvements have been noted can be readily attributed to better attention during testing. The major effect of the stimulants appears to be an improvement in classroom manageability rather than academic performance". In 1991, Barkley noted that "Psychostimulant medications (e.g., Ritalin) are highly effective treatments for the symptomatic management of children with ADHD as they can enhance significantly their attention span, impulse control, academic performance, and peer relationships".

In response to critics who point to countries with lower rates of diagnoses and medication of children for ADHD, Barkley said, "So what? We do not let the rest of the world set our standards of care when we do more research on childhood disorders--specifically ADHD--than other countries combined?".

Barkley believes that drugs such as Adderall, Ritalin and Concerta should be downgraded to schedule III.

During an interview in 2001, Barkley said that "All of the research we have indicates that these drugs are some of the safest that we employ in the field of psychiatry and psychology. That's not to say that we know everything about them. But we know a lot more than we know about cough medicines and Tylenol and aspirins and other things that children swill whenever they come down with a common cold. Nobody asks those questions about those over-the-counter medications, yet we know substantially less about them".

Barkley has compared “ADHD” to a physical handicap, with Ritalin being the equivalent of a wheelchair. On 16 November 1998 he said that "Ritalin will be ranked as one of the leading developments in this century for helping individuals". In 1999 Barkley said "Once convinced of an ADHD diagnosis there is no compelling reason (For someone diagnosed with ADHD) to avoid Ritalin".

Consultant
He has been a paid consultant, for pharmaceutical companies including Eli Lilly, McNeil, Janssen-Orth, Janssen-Cilag, Novartis, Shire, Takeda pharmaceuticals, and Theravance.

Books
 Attention Deficit Hyperactivity Disorder: A Handbook for Diagnosis and Treatment.4th ed. New York: Guilford Press, 2015. . 
 ADHD and the Nature of Self Control. New York: Guilford Press, 1997. .
 Taking Charge of ADHD: The Complete, Authoritative Guide for Parents. New York: Guilford Press, (3rd ed.) 2013. .
 With Kevin R Murphy and Mariellen Fischer. ADHD in Adults: What the Science Says. New York: Guilford Press, 2008. .
 Attention Deficit Hyperactivity Disorder in Adults: The Latest Assessment and Treatment Strategies. Sudbury, MA: Jones and Bartlett, 2010. .
 Taking Charge of Adult ADHD. New York: Guilford Press, 2010. .
 Executive Functions: What They Are, How They Work, and Why They Evolved. New York: Guilford Press, 2012. .
 Defiant Children: a Clinician's Manual for Assessment and Parent Training, 3rd ed. New York: Guilford Publications, 2013. .
 Managing ADHD in School: The Best Evidence-Based Methods for Teachers. Eau Claire, WI: PESI Publishing and Media, 2016. .
 When an Adult You Love Has ADHD. Washington, DC: American Psychological Association, 2017.

Awards

C. Anderson Aldrich Award, 1996, from the American Academy of Pediatrics for outstanding research in child health and human development
Distinguished Contribution Award to Research, 1998, by the Section of Clinical Child Psychology of the American Psychological Association
Science Dissemination Award, 2003, from the Society for Scientific Clinical Psychology of the American Psychological Association
Distinguished Career Award, 2012, from the Society of Clinical Child and Adolescent Psychology  
Lifetime Career Achievement Award, Division 53 (Clinical Child and Adolescent Psychology), American Psychological Association, 2017
Lifetime Achievement Award, Children and Adults with ADHD (chadd.org), 2018

References

External links
Official website

Educational psychologists
Living people
Attention deficit hyperactivity disorder researchers
Bowling Green State University alumni
University of North Carolina at Chapel Hill alumni
State University of New York Upstate Medical University faculty
University of Massachusetts Medical School faculty
1949 births
American educational psychologists